Enrico Toti was one of four s built for the  (Royal Italian Navy) during the late 1920s. The boat played a minor role in the Spanish Civil War of 1936–1939 supporting the Spanish Nationalists. She was the only Italian submarine to have sunk a Royal Navy submarine during the Second World War.

Design and description
They displaced  surfaced and  submerged. Their crew numbered 77 officers and enlisted men.

For surface running, the boats were powered by two  diesel engines, each driving one propeller shaft. When submerged each propeller was driven by a  electric motor.

The boats were armed with six internal  torpedo tubes, four in the bow and two in the stern, for which they carried a dozen torpedoes. They were also armed with a single  deck gun, forward of the conning tower, for combat on the surface. Their anti-aircraft armament consisted of two  machine guns.

Construction and service
Enrico Toti was laid down on 26 January 1925 at the Odero-Terni-Orlando shipyard in Muggiano, La Spezia. She was launched on 14 April 1928 and completed on 19 September. She was named after Enrico Toti, a First World War combatant posthumously awarded the Italian Gold Medal. A notable peacetime mission of Enrico Toti was the circumnavigation of Africa in 1934 along with her sister ship Antonio Sciesa. During the Spanish Civil War, the submarine unsuccessfully attacked the  cargo ship  on 9 August 1937 during a patrol off Valencia.

During the Second World War Enrico Toti was assigned to the Italian 4th Submarine Group’s 40th Squadron.

The sinking of HMS Triad
 was a T-class submarine of the Royal Navy that had set sail from Malta on 9 October 1940 under the command of Lieutenant-Commander G.S. Salt to join the 1st Submarine Flotilla at Alexandria.

Bandini, the officer on watch at the time, sighted the Triad on the surface at 01:00, and sounded battle stations on board the Italian submarine.  Both submarines altered course until they were heading towards each other.

Italian accounts record that the British submarine was the first to open fire with her deck gun, but she overshot. Triad also fired one torpedo, which the Italian ship turned to avoid.  Bandini's vessel opened fire on the British deck guns with her four  machine guns, preventing the Royal Navy personnel from operating their deck gun and driving them below deck.  Accounts show that the two submarines passed within four yards, with Triad cutting across the stern of the Italian vessel.

In an account of the engagement published in 1940, Italian writer and then navy war correspondent Dino Buzzati, who interviewed the Enrico Toti officers and crew after their return to base, reports that both submarines were so close that an Italian gunner, furious because he could not yet train the gun to the British submarine, actually threw his shoes at the head of a British gunner.

Enrico Toti launched a torpedo; however it caused no damage to the British submarine. At this stage, Lieutenant-Commander Salt began to dive his ship, however she was sunk during this manoeuvre by two direct shell hits from the 120 mm gun.

First Lieutenant Giovanni Cunsolo writes: "The submarine sinks, then in a desperate attempt to escape she tries to surface, stern-first, but soon after she disappears under the surface of the sea."

The time from first sighting until sinking was 30 to 45 minutes, and there were no survivors picked up by the Italian submarine or any other vessels.  For this action, the entire crew and their commander received an award.

From March to June 1942, Enrico Toti  was transferred to the Italian naval base at Pola, where she carried out 93 training sorties. She was later deployed to transport supplies to Italian forces in North Africa. The submarine accomplished four round missions to Libya carrying 194 ton of cargo. Decommissioned on 1 April 1943, Enrico Toti was converted into a blockship at Taranto, her hull being used as submarines' battery charger.

HMS Rainbow
It was long believed that HMS Triad had been sunk by a mine, and that the ship sunk by the Enrico Toti was in fact the R-class submarine , which was patrolling nearby and had not been in contact.  However, research in 1988 by the Royal Navy came to the conclusion that HMS Rainbow had been sunk in a collision with the Italian cargo ship Antonietta Costa which was part of an Italian convoy sailing back from Valona on 4 October 1940.

See also
 Italian submarines of World War II

References

Bibliography

External links
 Enrico Toti (1928) Marina Militare website

Balilla-class submarines
Ships built in La Spezia
Ships built by OTO Melara
1928 ships
World War II submarines of Italy